The 2015 Idaho State Bengals football team represented Idaho State University as a member of the Big Sky Conference during the 2015 NCAA Division I FCS football season. Led by fifth-year head coach Mike Kramer, the Bengals compiled an overall record of 2–9 with a mark of 1–7 in conference play, tying for 12th place in the Big Sky. Idaho State played their home games at Holt Arena in Pocatello, Idaho.

Schedule

Game summaries

Black Hills State

Portland State

at Boise State

at UNLV

at Cal Poly

at North Dakota

Eastern Washington

at Sacramento State

Montana

Montana State

at Weber State

Ranking movements

References

Idaho State
Idaho State Bengals football seasons
Idaho State Bengals football